Dreams (Original Motion Picture Soundtrack) is the soundtrack album to the 2016 Indonesian film titled Dreams. The album was released by Sony Music Entertainment Indonesia on January 27, 2016.

Singles
The soundtrack was preceded by the release of two singles. "Away" was released as the album's lead single on September 16, 2015, peaked at top 40 on the Indonesia Itunes Chart and "Percaya" was released as the second single on January 13, 2016;, both of that songs performed by Fatin Shidqia.

Track listing

References

2016 soundtrack albums
2010s film soundtrack albums
Sony Music soundtracks